This article lists the soundtracks to the Japanese visual novel and anime series Higurashi When They Cry.

Visual novels

PC

Thanks/you

Thanks/you is a music album composed by Japanese dōjin music artist, dai, for use in the "answer" arcs to the visual novel Higurashi no Naku Koro ni. Unofficially, fans had originally referred to this as the original soundtrack, even though it does not have all the scores that were used in the game.
Track listing
"Thanks"
"Iru

"Soul scour"

"Confession"
"you"

"feel"

"Birth and Death"

"you" (Vocal)

Production staff
Composer: dai
Vocals: Yuzuki
Lyrics: Yuki, Yuzuki
Cover illustrator: capital of sea

Higurashi no Naku Koro ni Kai Original Soundtrack

The  for the visual novels playable on the PC was first released by Lantis on August 23, 2006.
Track listing

CD 1
"air pizz"
"Testament"

"feel"
"you" (M.Box)

"Soul scour"

"Fearlessness"
"you – destructive"
"C-examination"
"search and destroy"

"being"
"Birth and death"
"confession"
"conviction"
"Iru"

"Cradle song"
"Gray"
"years"
"LIVE"
"Thanks"

"you"

CD 2

"utu"
"Frozen memories"
"Solitude"
"door"
"Liberating"
"Over the sky"
"Rain"
"Squall"

"daily passing by"
"daily passing by" (celesta)
"soak"
"what is wished"
"Amber"
"Bellflower"
"Big Bear"

"pros"
"Sheep counts"

Higurashi Daybreak Original Soundtrack

The  for the derivative game Higurashi Daybreak was released by the game's developers Twilight Frontier on April 22, 2007 in the thirty-fifth Sunshine Creation convention. Although a soundtrack for Higurashi Daybreak, it includes tracks only featured in the fandisc Higurashi no Naku Koro ni Rei and the demos of the original games. A forty-page short story "Higurashi Outbreak", written by Ryukishi07, was included in the CD jacket.
Track listing

CD 1
"from the sky"
"today's hero"
"2 on 2"
"close mission"
"prize machine"
"far east"
"elastico"
"just cause"
"thanks"
"speedster"
"sacred curry empire"
"antiguo"
"dernier"
"camouflage legend"
"fearlessness"
"night chaser"
"victory"
"defeat"
"to the sky"

CD 2

"kneecap"
"bright sun"
"spinning seesaw"
"close mission" (Arrange)
"far east" (Arrange)
"elastico" (Arrange)
"night chaser" (Arrange)
"to the sky" (Arrange)

PlayStation 2

Nageki no Mori

 is a single by Ayane. The song "Nageki no Mori" was used as the opening theme to the PlayStation 2 version of Higurashi no Naku Koro ni entitled Higurashi no Naku Koro ni Matsuri, while "Complex Image" was used as the opening theme to the Miotsukushi-hen on the same game. It was released the same day as the ending theme song single on February 22, 2007 by Geneon.
Track listing
 – 5:18
 – 4:59
 – 5:18
 – 4:59

Escape

Escape is a single by Kanako Itō. The song "Escape" was used as the ending theme to the Tsumihoroboshi-hen on the PlayStation 2 version of Higurashi no Naku Koro ni entitled Higurashi no Naku Koro ni Matsuri, while "Friend" was used as the ending theme to the Miotsukushi-hen on the same game. It was released the same day as the opening theme song single on February 22, 2007 by Geneon.
Track listing
"Escape"
"Friend"
"Escape" (off vocal)
"Friend" (off vocal)

Nintendo DS

Tsuisō no Despair

 is a single by Kanako Itō. The song "Tsuisō no Despair" was used as the opening theme song to the first volume of the Nintendo DS version of Higurashi no Naku Koro ni entitled Higurashi no Naku Koro ni Kizuna: Tatari. It was released on the same day as the game was released, on June 26, 2008 by 5pb..
Track listing

Place of Period

 is a single by Mio Isayama. The song "Place of Period" was used as the opening theme song to the second volume of the Nintendo DS version of Higurashi no Naku Koro ni entitled Higurashi no Naku Koro ni Kizuna: Sō. It was released on December 3, 2008 by 5pb..
Track listing

Hikari no Sora no Qualia

 is a single by Cyua. The song "Qualia of the Shining Sky" was used as the opening theme song to the third volume of the Nintendo DS version of Higurashi no Naku Koro ni entitled Higurashi no Naku Koro ni Kizuna: Rasen. It was released on June 10, 2009 by 5pb.. The second song on the single was sung by Velforest.
Track listing

Angelic Bright

 is a single by Ayane. The song "Angelic Bright" was used as the opening theme song to the fourth volume of the Nintendo DS version of Higurashi no Naku Koro ni entitled Higurashi no Naku Koro ni Kizuna: Kizuna. It was released on March 10, 2010 by 5pb..
Track listing

Anime

OP/ED themes

Higurashi no Naku Koro ni

 is the opening theme to the anime Higurashi no Naku Koro ni.
Track listing
  – 4:27
Lyrics: Eiko Shimamiya
Music: Nakazawa Tomoyuki
Arrange: Nakazawa Tomoyuki & Takase Kazuya
Sung by: Eiko Shimamiya
 "all alone"  – 6:04
  – 4:27
 "all alone" Instrumental – 6:04

Why, or Why Not

Why, or Why Not is the ending theme for the anime Higurashi no Naku Koro ni.
Track listing
 "Why, or Why Not" – 5:41
Lyrics: interface
Music/Arrange: Hiroyuki Oshima
Sung by: Rekka Katakiri
  – 5:30
 "Why, or Why Not" Instrumental – 5:41
  – 5:30

Naraku no Hana

 is the opening theme single to the anime Higurashi no Naku Koro ni Kai. The single was released on August 22, 2007, and is sung by Eiko Shimamiya.
Track listing

"FLOW"

"FLOW" (off vocal)

Taishō a

 is the ending theme single to the anime Higurashi no Naku Koro ni Kai. The single was released on August 22, 2007, and is sung by anNina.
Track listing

Original soundtracks

Higurashi no Naku Koro ni

Volume 1

Higurashi no Naku Koro ni Original Soundtrack is the first official soundtrack released for the series on July 21, 2006.
Track listing
  
 
 
 
 
 
 
 
 
 
 
 
 
 
 
 
 
 
 
 
 
 
 
 
 
 
 
 
 
 
 
 
 
 
 
 "Why, or Why Not" ~TV Version~

Volume 2

Higurashi no Naku Koro ni Original Soundtrack Vol. 2 is the second official soundtrack released for the series on October 6, 2006.
Track listing

Higurashi no Naku Koro ni Kai

Volume 1

Higurashi no Naku Koro ni Kai Original Soundtrack Vol. 1 is the third official soundtrack, released for the series on December 12, 2007.
Track listing

Volume 2

Higurashi no Naku Koro ni Kai Original Soundtrack Vol. 2 is the fourth official soundtrack, released for the series on January 30, 2008.
Track listing

Image album

The  was first released on September 27, 2006.
Track listing

 Composition: Tenmon
"my home"
 Vocals: 
"M・A・T・S・U・R・I-Meet Your Match！"
 Vocals: 
"when they cry"
 Vocals: 

 Composition: zts
"hymn"
 Composition: onoken
 Vocals: 
"samsara"
 Vocals: 
"you –Visionen im Spiegel"
 Vocals: 

 Composition: Tenmon

Character CDs

Volume 1

 was released on March 28, 2007. The tracks on the album were sung by three of the voice actors from the anime adaptation: Soichiro Hoshi (as Keiichi Maebara), Mai Nakahara (as Rena Ryugu), and Chafurin (as Kuraudo Oishi).
Track listing

Volume 2

 was released on April 25, 2007. The tracks on the album were sung by Satsuki Yukino, who played both Mion and Shion Sonozaki in the anime.
Track listing

Volume 3

 was released on July 25, 2007. The tracks on the album were sung by two of the voice actresses from the anime adaptation: Yukari Tamura (as Rika Furude)  and Mika Kanai (as Satoko Hojo).
Track listing

Character case books

Volume 1

 was released on December 29, 2007. The tracks on the album were sung by two of the voice actresses from the anime adaptation: Yukari Tamura (as Rika Furude)  and Yui Horie (as Hanyuu).
Track listing

Volume 2

 was released on December 29, 2007. The tracks on the album were sung by two of the voice actors from the anime adaptation: Tōru Ōkawa (as Jirō Tomitake)  and Miki Itō (as Takano Miyo).
Track listing

References

External links
Kenji Kawai's official website 
Dai's website for Thanks/you 

Anime soundtracks
Doujin music
Film and television discographies
Albums
Lantis (company) soundtracks
Video game music discographies
Video game soundtracks
Soundtracks by media franchise